Suparna Anand is an Indian actress from New Delhi. She has appeared in Malayalam and Hindi films. She is known for her portrayal of the titular Vaisali in the movie Vaisali, directed by Bharathan and written by M. T. Vasudevan Nair, as well as for her performance as Bhama in Njan Gandharvan, written and directed by P. Padmarajan.

Personal life
She was married to Sanjay Mitra, her co-star in Vaishali in 1997 and they have two sons, Manav Mitra (1999) and Bhavya Mitra (2001). However, they got divorced in 2008 and she remarried in 2010 to Rajesh, a Delhi-based businessman.

Career
Suparna Anand acted between 1979 and 1997. She acted in many Hindi, Kannada, Tamil, Telugu and Malayalam films in lead roles. She acted in the role of Jyoti Deshmukh in the  Anil Kapoor-Madhuri Dixit starrer Tezaab (1988). She played, Jyoti Deshmukh, Anil Kapoor's younger sister role.

Filmography

References

External links 
 

20th-century Indian actresses
Living people
Actresses in Malayalam cinema
Actresses in Hindi cinema
Actresses in Kannada cinema
Indian film actresses
Actresses from Kolkata
Actresses in Telugu cinema
Year of birth missing (living people)